Mark Atkin is a British filmmaker and director at Crossover Labs. He has directed and produced films, including co-producing The Big Melt and From the Sea to the Land Beyond, and organized film festival events.

Career 

From 1998 – 2008 Atkin was a commissioning editor for TV and online at Australia's Special Broadcasting Service, where he worked to bring Taxi to the Dark Side and Waltz with Bashir to screens. During this time, in 2006, he attended Sheffield Doc/Fest's MeetMarket as a buyer. In November 2008 he left SBS and began work at MeetMarket as producer and executive producer for three documentaries. One was Digging for Grandad's Gold, in which Atkin journeys to Poland in search of valuables that his Jewish grandfather buried on the family property in 1939 before fleeing from the German invasion.
While in Sheffield Atkin also collaborated with Doc/Fest's director Heather Croall and Frank Boyd of Unexpected Media to create the film production company Crossover.

Atkins is a marketplace consultant for the Australian International Documentary Conference, organising the international co-production market. He is also head of the Documentary Campus Masterschool and presents courses there. He ran workshops at Sheffield Doc/Fest in 2012 and 2013. After co-producing From the Sea to the Land Beyond, Atkin spoke about the project at TEDxSheffield in 2012.

In 2013 Atkin co-developed Animal Planet's Walking the Nile for Channel 4 in his role as multiplatform commissioning editor.

In 2015 Atkin was the acting director of the Sheffield Doc/Fest, and in 2015 and 2016 he curated the virtual reality section of the festival.

References

External links 

 Crossover official website
 Sheffield Doc/Fest official website
 Mark Atkin, Profile at tedxsheffield.com]

British documentary film producers
Year of birth missing (living people)
Living people